The 1390s was a decade of the Julian Calendar which began on January 1, 1390, and ended on December 31, 1399.

References